Sambar Salsa is a 2007 English-language film directed by Aditya Raj Kapoor and starring Rishi Kapoor, Preyanka, Roberta Caocci, and Ateesh Randev in the lead roles.

Synopsis 
An Indian man, Surya, and a Spanish woman, Sasha, fall in love much to the disapproval of Surya's parents (Om and Alamelu) even though they had also acted in defiance of their elders.

Cast 
Source
Rishi Kapoor as Om Suri
Preyanka as Alamelu
Roberta Caocci as Sasha
Ateesh Randev as Surya
Rashami Desai
Alessia Bonnaci
Colin Duval 
Paulette Michelle
 Guy Morris
 Thara Prashad
Ateesh Randev
Damian Regan

The music director, Taz, makes a cameo appearance as himself.

Release 
The Sunday Times wrote that "It is a worthy project with plenty of potential to examine current British Asian family ties, cultural differences, and the difficulties often face in gaining acceptance to communal and inter-racial love".

References

External links 
 

Films shot in India
Films shot in Spain
2000s English-language films